Haçıalmuradlı (also, Hajial-Muradli, Hajiali-Muradli, and Hadjialmuradli) is a village and municipality in the Imishli Rayon of Azerbaijan.  It has a population of 1,232.

References 

Populated places in Imishli District